Bojan Ciger (born 18 June 1994) is a Serbian professional footballer who plays as a centre-back for Malaysia Super League club Kedah Darul Aman.

Career

In 2019, he signed for Rad. In 2020, he signed for Navbanor. After that, he signed for Kedah Darul Aman.

References

1994 births
Living people
Serbian footballers
Kedah Darul Aman F.C. players